Yeltsino is a rural locality (a village) in Vysokovskoye Rural Settlement, Ust-Kubinsky District, Vologda Oblast, Russia. The population was 2 as of 2002.

Geography 
Yeltsino is located 24 km northeast of Ustye (the district's administrative centre) by road. Staroye is the nearest rural locality.

References 

Rural localities in Tarnogsky District